David Cuningham (born 30 March 1997) is an Australian rules footballer playing for the Carlton Football Club in the Australian Football League (AFL).  He was educated at Melbourne Grammar School. He was drafted by the Carlton Football Club with their fourth selection and twenty-third overall in the 2015 national draft. He made his debut in Round 21, 2016 against  at the Gabba. 

Cuningham received the AFL Rising Star nomination in round 12 of the 2017 AFL season kicking 2 goals in Carlton's one-point win over Greater Western Sydney. At the end of 2017 he signed a two-year contract extension. During 2019, he signed another contract extension to the end of 2022.

His opportunities at senior level have been hampered by injury throughout this career, troubled by his hip in 2016, his knee in 2018 and 2019, his calf in 2020, and an anterior cruciate ligament rupture in 2021.

Statistics
Statistics are correct to the end of round 1, 2020

|- style="background-color: #EAEAEA"
! scope="row" style="text-align:center" | 2016
|style="text-align:center;"|
| 28 || 3 || 0 || 0 || 14 || 17 || 31 || 8 || 9 || 0.0 || 0.0 || 4.7 || 5.7 || 10.3 || 2.7 || 5.3
|-
! scope="row" style="text-align:center" | 2017
|style="text-align:center;"| 
| 28 || 8 || 6 || 1 || 63 || 40 || 103 || 27 || 34 || 0.7 || 0.1 || 7.9 || 5 || 12.9 || 3.4 || 4.2
|- style="background-color: #EAEAEA"
! scope="row" style="text-align:center" | 2018
|style="text-align:center;"|
| 28 || 5 || 1 || 0 || 24 || 37 || 61 || 12 || 8 || 0.2 || 0.0 || 4.8 || 7.4 || 12.2 || 2.4 || 1.6
|-
! scope="row" style="text-align:center" | 2019
|style="text-align:center;"| 
| 28 || 9 || 7 || 5 || 65 || 79 || 144 || 28 || 32 || 0.8 || 0.6 || 7.2 || 8.8 || 16.0 || 3.1 || 3.6
|- style="background-color: #EAEAEA"
! scope="row" style="text-align:center" | 2020
|style="text-align:center;"|
| 28 || 1 || 2 || 1 || 7 || 1 || 8 || 3 || 1 || 2.0 || 1.0 || 7.0 || 1.0 || 8.0 || 3.0 || 1.0
|- class="sortbottom"
! colspan=3| Career
! 26
! 16
! 7
! 173
! 174
! 347
! 78
! 91
! 0.6
! 0.3
! 6.7
! 6.7
! 13.3
! 3.0
! 3.5
|}

References

External links

1997 births
Living people
Carlton Football Club players
Preston Football Club (VFA) players
Australian rules footballers from Victoria (Australia)
Oakleigh Chargers players
People educated at Melbourne Grammar School
Australian people of Canadian descent